Vectorbeam was an arcade game manufacturer active in the late 1970s who specialized in vector graphics-based arcade games. It was formed after splitting off from its primary competitor, Cinematronics, and disappeared after re-merging with them soon after.

Vectorbeam was founded by Larry Rosenthal based on his graduate work from the Massachusetts Institute of Technology and which he patented for a custom arcade vector display. Vectorbeam was in direct competition with other arcade game manufacturers. The company ceased operations soon after poor sales of its Barrier arcade game, and sold its assets to Cinematronics.

List of Vectorbeam games 
 Space War (arcade game) (1977)
 Barrier (1979)
 Speed Freak (arcade game) (1979)
 Tail Gunner (1979)
 Warrior (arcade game) (1979)

References 

Defunct video game companies of the United States